The twenty dollar bill may refer to banknotes (bills) of currencies that are named dollar. Note that some of these currencies may have coins for 20 dollars instead. Some of these currencies may not have this denomination at all.

 Australian 20 dollar note
 Canadian twenty-dollar bill
 United States twenty-dollar bill
 New Zealand twenty dollar note